United Nations Security Council Resolution 2033 was unanimously adopted on 12 January 2012 on relationship with African Union relating to conflict prevention.

See also 
List of United Nations Security Council Resolutions 2001 to 2100

References

External links
Text of the Resolution at undocs.org

2012 United Nations Security Council resolutions
2012 in Africa
January 2012 events